Alan Czerwiński (born 2 February 1993) is a Polish professional footballer who plays as a right-back for Lech Poznań.

Career
On 10 January 2020 he signed a three-year contract with Lech Poznań. The deal took effect after 2020–21 season. Alan made his debut for Lech during round of 64 game of Polish Cup against Odra Opole on 15 August 2020. During first months he helped Lech to reach UEFA Europa League group stage playing in all 4 qualification rounds.

International career
On 6 October 2020 he was additionally called-up to national team for the friendly match against Finland and the UEFA Nations League matches against Italy and Bosnia and Herzegovina. One day later he made his debut in national team against Finland.

Career statistics

Club

International

Honours
Lech Poznań
 Ekstraklasa: 2021–22

References

External links
 
 

1993 births
Living people
Polish footballers
Poland international footballers
GKS Katowice players
Zagłębie Lubin players
Lech Poznań players
Lech Poznań II players
I liga players
II liga players
Ekstraklasa players
People from Olkusz
Association football defenders